Suthers is a surname. Notable people with the surname include:

John Suthers (born 1951), American attorney and politician
Marie H. Suthers (1895–1983), American politician and educator
Robert Bentley Suthers (1871–?), British writer

See also
Suther